Christopher 'Chris' Mark Bagshaw Tetley (born 13 September 1974) is a former English cricketer.  Tetley was a left-handed batsman who bowled leg break.  He was born in Worcester, Worcestershire and later educated at the Royal Grammar School Worcester.

Tetley represented the Middlesex Cricket Board in a single List A match against Scotland in the 1st round of the 2002 Cheltenham & Gloucester Trophy which was held in 2001.  In his only List A match he scored a single run and with the ball he bowled 10 wicket-less overs.

References

External links
Chris Tetley at Cricinfo
Chris Tetley at CricketArchive

1974 births
Living people
Sportspeople from Worcester, England
People educated at the Royal Grammar School Worcester
English cricketers
Middlesex Cricket Board cricketers